Narasimha Raya II (r. 1491-1505) (born = 1468)( Narasimha II, Immadi Narasimha Raya or Dhamma Thimma Raya) was the third and last ruler of the Saluva dynasty, the second of the four dynasties to rule the Vijayanagara Empire.

Background
Narasimha's father, also named Narasimha, had begun life as an army commander serving the Sangama dynasty, which was the dynasty that had founded the Empire in the 13th century. The Sangama dynasty had been gradually weakening over time for a variety of reasons, and in 1485, the senior Narasimha had usurped the throne after capturing the capital and driving out his former overlord, Sangama Praudha Raya. The actual military campaign for this purpose had been carried out by his loyal subordinate, Tuluva Narasa Nayaka.

The senior Narasimha was crowned Emperor and became known as Saluva Narasimha Deva Raya. He died in 1491, only six years after usurping the throne, and left behind two young sons as his heirs. On his deathbed, he entrusted the young boys to the care of his trusted subordinate, Tuluva Narasa Nayaka. The elder son, Thimma Bhupala, was killed within a few weeks after his father's death by an army commander loyal to the old Sangama dynasty. This brought the second son, Narasimha, to the throne.

Reign
Thus, Narasimha II came to the throne following the violent death of his elder brother. He was only a teenager when he became Emperor of the Vijayanagara Empire, and real power lay in the hands of his guardian, Tuluva Narasa Nayaka. This situation continued for twelve years until Tuluva Narasa Nayaka died in 1503. By this time, Narasimha was an adult and there was no justification for the appointment of a regent. Nevertheless, the late regent's eldest son, Tuluva Vira Narasimha Raya, remained the power behind the throne due to his control of the army. He compelled Narasimha to name him Dalavoy (commander-in-chief of the army) and also sarvadhikari ("Administrator General," effectively Regent).

There developed an atmosphere of great tension between the two Narasimhas (Emperor Saluva Narasimha II and his Minister Tuluva Vira Narasimha). Both of them considered that they had a greater right to rule the state. After all, Narasimha had become Emperor only because his father had usurped the throne, and that also very recently. That usurpation had in fact been made possible by the efforts and resourcefulness of his trusted general, Tuluva Narasa Nayaka, who had captured the capital in the name of the usurper. Not only that, but Tuluva Narasa Nayaka had also later pacified the country, suppressed the supporters of the old Sangama dynasty, and maintained order during the minority of the usurper's two sons. With all this background, Tuluva Vira Narasimha felt that he had a greater right to rule than Emperor Narasimha. Why should he, his sons and grandsons be no more than courtiers serving the upstart dynasty which had been established mainly by the efforts of his own father? The situation was fraught with tension and many resentments.

Death
Finally, in 1505, only two years after the death of the old regent Tuluva Narasa Nayaka, Emperor Saluva Narasimha was assassinated at his fortress of Penukonda, probably by henchmen of Vira Narasimha. With his death ended the reign of the Saluva dynasty, whose three emperors (father and two sons) had reigned for a total of only twenty years.

Upon Narasimha's death, Dalavoy (commander-in-chief) Tuluva Vira Narasimha Raya was proclaimed Emperor of Vijayanagara and the Tuluva dynasty came to power.

Notes

References
Suryanath U. Kamath, A Concise history of Karnataka from pre-historic times to the present, Jupiter books, MCC, Bangalore, 2001 (Reprinted 2002) OCLC: 7796041

People of the Vijayanagara Empire
Indian Hindus
Hindu monarchs
1505 deaths
Year of birth unknown